The Filipino Academy of Movie Arts and Sciences, on behalf of the Santiago family, bestowed the Dr. Ciriaco Santiago Memorial Award to performers, producers, and directors of productions that have gained international recognition for their cinematic excellence.

The award was given in honor of Dr. Ciriaco Santiago, studio chief of Premiere Productions.

Awardees
 1959 Susan Roces
 1962 Lamberto Avellana
 1964 Eddie Romero.
 1968 Emmanuel Rojas.
 1971 Eddie Romero
 1972 Atty. Espiridion Laxa
 1973 Dr. Jose Perez
 1974 Joseph Estrada
 1976 Teodoro Valencia
 1980 Jessie Ejercito
 1982 Lily Monteverde
 1987 Eddie Romero
 1988 Bobby A. Suarez
 1999 Monique Wilson
 2000 Gary Valenciano
 2001 Donita Rose
 2002 Geneva Cruz

References

FAMAS Award
Awards established in 1959